The Sugarmill is a nightclub and music venue in Hanley, Stoke-on-Trent, that opened in 1994.

Events

The Sugarmill hosts Electric Friday club nights weekly, the longest running alternative club night in Staffordshire. The last Friday of each month is the Electric All-Nighter, open until 6am.

The club also hosts The Move on occasional Saturdays and every Bank Holiday Sunday, a club night which brings the biggest names in international house music.

Their club nights are open to over 18s only, all their shows (unless stated otherwise) are open to over 14s.

About

The Sugarmill is situated at the bottom of Brunswick Street in the heart of the Cultural Quarter of Hanley, the city centre of Stoke-on-Trent. It can be seen next to the Stage Door pub and opposite the Fiction night club.

Artists

It has hosted many bands, some of which went on to gain great success. For example: 
 Coldplay
 Muse
 Elbow
 DJ Falcon & Alan Braxe
 Daft Punk
 Stereophonics
 A Day to Remember
 The 1975
 The National 
 Maxïmo Park
 Kasabian
 Lamb of God 
 Biffy Clyro 
 Catfish and the Bottlemen
 Trivium
 Bring Me the Horizon 
 Foals 
 You Me at Six
 Glassjaw
 Editors
 The Libertines

The Sugarmill actively promotes the local band scene and also attempts to attract bigger names to play at The Victoria Hall and Keele University.

External links
 Official site
 Facebook

Buildings and structures in Stoke-on-Trent
Music venues in Staffordshire
Tourist attractions in Stoke-on-Trent